Mecomischus is a genus of North African flowering plants in the  chamomile tribe within the daisy family.

 Species
 Mecomischus halimifolius (Munby) Hochr. - Morocco, Algeria
 Mecomischus pedunculatus (Coss. & Durieu) Oberpr. & Greuter - Algeria

References

Flora of North Africa
Asteraceae genera
Anthemideae